Pterolophia pseudocaudata is a species of beetle in the family Cerambycidae. It was described by Stephan von Breuning in 1961. It has a wide distribution in Africa.

References

pseudocaudata
Beetles described in 1961